The Argentina Vexillology Association is a cultural institution that specializes in the culture of the science of vexillology.

History
It was founded by Alberto Rubén Perazzo in Buenos Aires, Argentina, on February 16, 1988 and is affiliated to the International Federation of Vexillological Associations.

Governance
Alberto Rubén Perazzo, AAV president
Francisco Gregoric, secretary
Mario Paulise, treasurer

References

Vexillological organizations
International Federation of Vexillological Associations